Synaptotagmin-9 is a protein that in humans is encoded by the SYT9 gene.

Interactions 

SYT9 has been shown to interact with SYNCRIP, TUBB and TRPV1.

References

Further reading 

 
 
 
\*